Všetaty may refer to places in the Czech Republic:

Všetaty (Mělník District), a market town
Všetaty (Rakovník District), a municipality and village